Sari Gat Hut Gat Bala (also Romanized as Sarī Gat Hūt Gat Bālā) is a village in Bahu Kalat Rural District, Dashtiari District, Chabahar County, Sistan and Baluchestan Province, Iran. At the 2006 census, its population was 283, in 54 families.

References 

Populated places in Chabahar County